Isobel Selina Miller Kuhn, born Isobel Selina Miller, aka, "Belle" (December 17, 1901 – March 20, 1957), known as Isobel Kuhn, was a Canadian Christian missionary to the Lisu people of Yunnan Province, China, and northern Thailand. She served with the China Inland Mission, along with her husband, John, as a Bible translator, church planter, Bible teacher, evangelist and authored nine books about her experiences.

Early life
Isobel Selina Miller was born in Toronto, Ontario, Canada, and moved with her family to Vancouver, British Columbia, when she was eleven years old. She was called "Belle" from the time she was a child. Her father was a roentgenologist and a Presbyterian lay preacher at a rescue mission, and her mother was president of the Women's Missionary Society in the Canadian Presbyterian church for many years. Her grandfather was an ordained Presbyterian minister.

Kuhn was raised in a loving Christian home although, in her words, it was without having "a direct confrontation with [the] living Savior" herself. After experiencing a "pitying sneer" from a skeptical University of British Columbia English professor, Kuhn decided that she did not need to know or seek the God her parents had been teaching her about. She became an agnostic, like many of her peers. A vivacious and popular young woman who did not drink or smoke, Kuhn was taught by her parents to do what was respectable and to "marry well," which meant she was to marry a man with a good education and social status like her own. While at the university, she had gained a lifetime membership in the coveted college drama troupe as a freshman, which was a rare honor.

Even though she had abandoned Christian teachings, she was still "considered a good girl, even a 'Christian'!," by some of her friends and acquaintances Yet after a crisis in which she discovered that the man to whom she was secretly engaged not only was unfaithful to her  but also told her to expect the same treatment in their marriage, she was on the verge of taking her own life. Instead of drinking a bottle of poison from the bathroom medicine cabinet, however, Kuhn listened to the sound of her father's sleeping groans from his bedroom and remembered that he had been a "dear, kind father...." She went back to her bedroom and thought of a Latin quote from a Dante poem, which she believed was translated, "In His will is our peace." She considered that if God did exist, she certainly was not "in His will"; perhaps, she thought, that was why she had no peace.

Deciding to pray but not wanting to be duped by a "mental opiate," the unsure young woman whispered a prayer "with raised hands to God, to prove to her that He is and to give her peace; and, if He did she would give her whole life to Him - do anything He asked her to do, no matter what He asked - no matter where He asked her to go, for her whole life." Afterward, she decided to study the life of Jesus Christ in the Gospels. However, Kuhn was very much a secret Christian in the beginning, renouncing "worldly" pursuits a little at a time, but struggling to pray often.

In May, 1922, Isobel Kuhn graduated with honors in English Language and Literature, a major, from the University of British Columbia. Her intention was to become a dean of women and teach at a university. She taught third grade at the Cecil Rhodes School in Vancouver for more than a year, living in a boarding house because her family had moved to Victoria.

In 1924, while attending her second consecutive Christian summer missions conference at The Firs [original] in Bellingham, Washington, Kuhn met James O. Fraser, the conference speaker and the man who would become one of her greatest spiritual mentors and friends. The following September, Kuhn began studying at Moody Bible Institute in Chicago, Illinois. A staunch Canadian, the missionary-to-be never would have chosen this school on her own initiative; however, a Christian acquaintance who gave Kuhn the train fare and startup money for the first year requested that she go there. She had actually begun preparing to become a missionary by attending night classes at Vancouver Bible School.

At Moody, her energies were then focused on the Tibeto-Burman Lisu people, on the China-Burma [Myanmar] border, after meeting and hearing Mr. Frasier speak at The Firs and being convinced that was what God wanted her to do. Although she missed a semester of school because of illness, she graduated from Moody as valedictorian in December, 1926. At the school she had participated in open-air preaching, playing piano at a boy's reformatory, and working in neighborhood visitation ministries. For the most part, she also worked through school to pay her way, though she also received unexpected financial support when it was needed. At Moody she also met her future husband, John Becker Kuhn, whom she once called "another dreamer". He had started school a year earlier than his bride-to-be, and went to China alone, as was the mission's counsel at the time concerning unmarrieds when only one of them had been accepted by the mission.

Kuhn's mother had at one time told her that "the only way this young Christian would become a missionary was over her mother's dead body." This caused Kuhn much anxiety, because as a Christian she wanted to honor her mother and father. As this missionary-to-be wrote, she was "too young in the Lord to understand that obeying God comes before obeying parents." Ultimately, her mother  allowed her to go to Moody.  Kuhn's mother died during an operation (while Kuhn was in her first semester at Moody), acknowledging to a woman friend that her daughter had "chosen the better way."

Once graduated, Kuhn applied to the China Inland Mission, but was rejected at first because of a character reference which gave a negative report. But after further review and almost a two-year wait - which included both a delay until the "foreign uprising of 1927" cooled down and her mission's ordering a six-month delay, including one month of complete bed rest because of previous overwork - her desire to become a missionary was fulfilled, and she sailed for China.

During the almost two years Kuhn was made to wait for her passage, she lived with her father and brother, who had both moved back to Vancouver. She needed to earn a living because her father was unwilling to support his daughter's mission endeavors financially, though he supported her decision to become a missionary. But she was afraid that if she signed a contract to teach again, she would be bound until the end of the contract and not be able to quit at a moment's notice to leave for China. On a whim she took an unpaid speaking engagement before a women's group and, much to her surprise, was asked to be the superintendent of what was then called "Vancouver Girls' Corner Club" for a salary of $80 a month - a small amount even then. The club was an evangelistic outreach to business and professional women, who met in a downtown Vancouver building during the work week to talk and eat bag lunches together. The superintendent's responsibilities included being available for the women at noontime to meet them and to evangelize when possible. For the newly minted Bible school graduate, it was a paid position that she grew to love deeply, but could resign from on a moment's notice

China
It was October 11, 1928, Isobel sailed on a passenger ship out of Vancouver to China. As a new missionary she was totally unprepared for the cost of things, from the poverty to the vermin to the Lisu diet to the crowds - and more. In these times, she would "fall on her knees and weep before the Lord," asking Him to help her. Kuhn eventually found ways to cope with certain irritations, like fleas; she even grew to enjoy certain things she initially couldn't stomach, like "large chunks" of boiled pork fat and bean curd. She married John Kuhn in Kunming, the capital of Yunnan Province, on November 4, 1929.

Over the next twenty four years they served together - like her mentor, J. O. Fraser, who came before them and who also worked alongside them until 1938. Although John Kuhn's leadership duties (and eventually his CIM superintendent duties) separated him from his sheep frequently - sometimes for as long as a year - throughout all of their ministry in China, the Kuhns first ministered in Chengchiang, Yunnan, from 1929-1930, and in Tali [Dali], Yunnan, which had been without missionaries for the previous year They were there from 1930-1932. While in Tali, the Kuhns had a baby girl, Kathryn Ann, in April, 1931. They then ministered in Yongping, Yunnnan, a mostly Muslim area, from 1932-1934. The Kuhns lived in an area of the city that had a lower percentage of Muslims. They ministered among the Lisu, in China, from 1934 until 1950.

In 1936, after 16 months of ministering in "Lisuland," the Kuhns took their first furlough to see both their families, in Manheim, PA, and Vancouver, respectively. John had been on the mission field for 10 years; Isobel, for eight years. Back in China, "Belle" had her second child, a son, Daniel Kreadman, in August, 1943. In 1942, they started a Bible school for girls and, in 1943, one for boys.

The communist revolution in China forced Belle and her son Danny to leave the country in March, 1950, and to put her missionary life on hold for two years. John Kuhn left China 18 months after his wife. While on furlough, the Kuhns spent their time in Wheaton, Illinois, because their daughter was studying at Wheaton College.

Sensing God's call again, but with China closed to them, the Kuhns continued their ministry in 1952 among another Lisu people group, this time in northern Thailand, until 1954, when they retired.

Death
Isobel Miller Kuhn was diagnosed with cancer in 1954 and died on March 20, 1957, with her husband at her sidein Wheaton. Her funeral was held at Wheaton College Church.

Legacy
Fifty years after the death of Isobel Kuhn, Christianity has been thriving in the Salween River valley where the Lisu live in China. Of the 18,000 Lisu who lived in Fugong, Yunnan, in 1950, 3,400 professed faith in Christ. As of 2007, it is estimated that 80-90 per cent of the 70,000 population make the same profession. In Yunnan, it is estimated that there are between 100,000-200,000 Lisu Christians in total. More than 75,000 Lisu Bibles have been legally printed in China following this explosive growth.

Today, this strong Christian presence in the Lisu communities of China and beyond can be attributed at least in part to Isobel Kuhn and her idea to start what she called the "Rainy Season Bible School." This was a school borne of the fact that, in the heavily agricultural area where the Kuhns ministered, the rainy season disrupted all normal life. Isobel Kuhn formed a plan to hold classes during this agricultural down time, not only to preach the historic Christian Gospel but also to teach the Lisu the basics of the Christian faith. These classes were taught by Kuhn and others. From these classes, countless men who became evangelists and pastors took the Christian message to untold numbers of nationals and travelers throughout China.

Kuhn's autobiographical and biographical missionary writings are still in print over fifty years after they were first published.

Quotes
About Isobel Kuhn's life early on when she forsook Christianity, she wrote:

Of her brief Bible school years, Kuhn reflects:

One of Kuhn's quips about her missionary years with the Lisu:

Works

 (Autobiography. Part 1)
 (Autobiography. Part 2)
 Green Leaf in Drought - Time, Moody Press (1957)  (The story of Arthur & Wilda Matthews, the last CIM missionaries to leave China.)
 Stones of Fire, China Inland Mission (1951) 
 Ascent to the Tribes: Pioneering in North Thailand, Moody Press (1956) 
 Precious Things of the Lasting Hills, China Inland Mission (1963) 
 Children of the Hills, OMF International (1999) (Formerly called, Precious Things....)
 Second-Mile People, OMF Books (December 1982)
 Nests Above the Abyss, Moody Press (1964)

Some later editions of Kuhn's works have been edited and revised by others.

See also
 Historical Bibliography of the China Inland Mission

Notes

Further reading
 Broomhall, Alfred James; Hudson Taylor & China's Open Century Volume Seven: It Is Not Death To Die; Hodder and Stoughton and Overseas Missionary Fellowship, (1989)
 Canfield, Carolyn; One Vision Only (1959)
 Reason, Joyce; Searcher for God: The Story of Isobel Kuhn (1964)
 Repp, Gloria; Nothing Daunted: The Story of Isobel Kuhn (1995)
 Taylor, James Hudson III; Christ Alone - A Pictorial Presentation of Hudson Taylor's Life and Legacy; OMF International, (2005)

External links
 
 Isobel Miller Kuhn Ephemera at Wheaton College's "Billy Graham Center"
 Isobel Kuhn's Funeral Service - March 22, 1957
 October 2007 article: 1930's(?) Isobel Kuhn photo in Lisu dress and a portion of her letter describing her 1928 passage to China
 OMF International 

1901 births
1957 deaths
Translators of the Bible into China's tribal languages
Canadian Presbyterian missionaries
Canadian evangelicals
Presbyterian missionaries in China
Christian writers
Female Christian missionaries
Wheaton College (Illinois) alumni
People from Old Toronto
20th-century women writers
20th-century translators
Presbyterian missionaries in Thailand
Deaths from cancer in Illinois
Canadian expatriates in China
Canadian expatriates in Thailand
Missionary linguists
People from Wheaton, Illinois
Female Bible Translators